John Ewasew (13 March 1922 – 26 March 1978) was a Canadian lawyer and senator. A Liberal, he was appointed to the Senate of Canada on 17 December 1976 on the recommendation of Pierre Trudeau. He represented the senatorial division of Montarville, Quebec until his death.

External links 

A brief biography from The Ukrainian Weekly

1922 births
1978 deaths
Canadian senators from Quebec
Lawyers in Quebec
Liberal Party of Canada senators
Canadian people of Ukrainian descent
People from Grenfell, Saskatchewan
20th-century Canadian lawyers